Purple Tape is the debut album by Lisa Loeb, self-released in 1992 on audio cassette only, used to pitch her to record companies. The record features mostly Loeb's voice accompanied by a guitar. Loeb would later include and re-record the majority of these songs on her later albums Tails and Firecracker.

While some songs of the album were later released as b-sides on some of Loeb's singles, the album did not see its CD release until January 22, 2008, when it was released as a two-CD including an extensive interview with Loeb about the album.

Track listing

References

External links
 
 

1992 debut albums
Lisa Loeb albums
Interview albums
Self-released albums